Tommy Coyle (born 2 September 1989) is a British former professional boxer who competed from 2009 to 2019. He held the Commonwealth lightweight title in 2018, and has challenged once for the British light-welterweight title in 2016. He is the older brother of Hull City footballer Lewie Coyle.

Professional career
Coyle made his professional debut on 18 September 2009, winning a six-round points decision against Kristian Laight. On 6 October 2012, having won his first thirteen fights, Coyle lost a three-round unanimous decision to Gary Sykes in the quarter-finals of the Prizefighter lightweight tournament. Coyle suffered his second professional defeat to Derry Mathews on 13 July 2013, in a tenth-round stoppage.

Two of Coyle's best wins came in 2014, beginning with a last-round stoppage over Daniel Brizuela on 22 February, in what was named a Fight of the Year candidate by ESPN, and Round of the Year by The Ring magazine. This was followed up on 25 October with a surprise knockout of battled-hardened slugger Michael Katsidis in two rounds.

Coyle vs. Campbell 
These two fights helped set up a showdown with fellow Hull native and 2012 Olympic gold medallist Luke Campbell, with their highly anticipated fight eventually taking place on 1 August 2015. After being knocked down four times, Coyle was stopped in the tenth round.

Coyle vs. Nurse 
After moving up to light-welterweight and scoring a points decision victory over Reynaldo Mora, Coyle challenged British champion Tyrone Nurse. Coyle lost a closely contested unanimous decision despite knocking Nurse down in the seventh round.

Coyle vs. Dodd 
On April 21, 2018, Coyle fought Sean Dodd for the Commonwealth lightweight title. Coyle managed to stop Dodd in the sixth round and win the belt.

Coyle vs. Algieri 
On June 1, 2019, Coyle fought Chris Algieri, ranked #5 by the WBO at super lightweight, on the Anthony Joshua vs Andy Ruiz Jr undercard. After an entertaining first half of the fight, Algieri battered Coyle in the eighth round, which prompted Coyle's corner to pull him from the fight, awarding Algieri the victory.

Professional boxing record

References

External links

Tommy Coyle profile at Matchroom Boxing
Tommy Coyle - Profile, News Archive & Current Rankings at Box.Live

Lightweight boxers
English male boxers
1989 births
Sportspeople from Kingston upon Hull
Living people
Light-welterweight boxers
Prizefighter contestants